The LNWR 380 Class was a class of 0-8-4T steam tank locomotives designed by H. P. M. Beames.  Although designed under the LNWR regime they appeared as LMS locomotives after the 1923 grouping. They were essentially an extended version of the 1185 Class 0-8-2T with a longer bunker, and were also related to the 0-8-0 freight engines.  Their main area of work was to be in South Wales.

Numbering
The first thirteen were given LNWR numbers when new, because the LMS numbering scheme had not yet been finalised. The last seventeen carried LMS numbers 7943–7959 from new, although the first two of these had been allotted LNWR numbers (which they never carried in service). The first thirteen were renumbered 7930–7942 between 1926 and 1928. The LMS gave them the power classification 5F. Withdrawal began in 1944. Fourteen survived into British Railways ownership in 1948 and were to be renumbered between 47930 and 47959 (i.e. the LMS numbers increased by 40000), but only two survived long enough to be renumbered 47931 and 47937, the last withdrawal occurring in 1951.

Notes

References

Further reading
 Edward Talbot (2002) The London & North Western Railway Eight-Coupled Goods Engines

External links
 Class 7F-A Details at Rail UK
 Goods Engines of LNWR

380 class
0-8-4T locomotives
Railway locomotives introduced in 1923
Standard gauge steam locomotives of Great Britain
Scrapped locomotives